The Pointe de Barasson is a mountain of the Swiss Pennine Alps, located on the border between Switzerland and Italy. It lies between the Great St Bernard Pass and Mont Vélan.

References

External links
 Pointe de Barasson on Hikr

Mountains of the Alps
Mountains of Switzerland
Mountains of Italy
Italy–Switzerland border
International mountains of Europe
Mountains of Valais
Two-thousanders of Switzerland